Godey Murahari (20 May 1926 – 1982) in Jamshedpur  was former Deputy Speaker  of 6th Lok Sabha and Member of Lok Sabha, Parliament of India. He was also member of Rajya Sabha from Uttar Pradesh from 1962 to 1977 and Rajya Sabha Deputy Chairman from 1972 to 1977. He belongs to Perike (Puragiri Kshatriya) caste.
 He died in 1982.

References

1926 births
1982 deaths
India MPs 1977–1979
Deputy Speakers of the Lok Sabha
People from Jamshedpur
Lok Sabha members from Andhra Pradesh
Rajya Sabha members from Uttar Pradesh
Deputy Chairman of the Rajya Sabha
Telugu politicians